This is a round-up of the 1991 Mayo Senior Football Championship. Hollymount, first-time winners the previous year, retained the Moclair Cup by defeating Westport in the final, with the latter making their first final appearance since 1942.

First round

Quarter finals

Semi-finals

Mayo Senior Football Championship Final

References

 Western People (Summer/Autumn 1991)

External links

Mayo Senior Football Championship
1991